Tudal Hill, is one of the major hills shared between Mukim Amo, Temburong District of Brunei and Limbang Division, Sarawak of Malaysia.

Description 
Lasianthus bruneensis were found on the hill, alongside Meligan sandstone found on headwaters of the Temburong River between Tudal Hill and Lesong Hill. Mix of hill forests also grow on the hills of Tudal and Pagon.

References

Temburong District
Mountains of Brunei
Bukit Pagon
International mountains of Asia
Brunei–Malaysia border